Maze Runner: The Death Cure (also known simply as The Death Cure) is a 2018 American dystopian science fiction film directed by Wes Ball and written by T.S. Nowlin, based on the 2011 novel The Death Cure written by James Dashner. It is the sequel to the 2015 film Maze Runner: The Scorch Trials and the third and final installment in the Maze Runner film series. The film stars Dylan O'Brien, Kaya Scodelario, Thomas Brodie-Sangster, Dexter Darden, Nathalie Emmanuel, Giancarlo Esposito, Aidan Gillen, Walton Goggins, Ki Hong Lee, Jacob Lofland, Katherine McNamara, Barry Pepper, Will Poulter, Rosa Salazar, and Patricia Clarkson.

Maze Runner: The Death Cure was originally set to be released on February 17, 2017, in the United States by 20th Century Fox, but the studio rescheduled the film's release for January 26, 2018, allowing time for O'Brien to recover from injuries he sustained during filming. The film received mixed reviews from critics with praise for the cast performances, action sequences and visual effects but criticism for the storyline and character development. The film grossed over $288 million worldwide.

Plot 

Thomas, Newt and Frypan are the last of the free "Gladers". They and the Right Arm resistance retrieve other Immunes from a carriage of a train operated by WCKD, an organization responsible for capturing and experimenting on immune children. They discover that Minho, their remaining Glader friend whom WCKD had captured, was on a different carriage, which is headed to the "Last City", WCKD's base of operations. Against the orders of Vince, the leader of the Right Arm, the three head to Last City to rescue Minho, who is being tortured by WCKD in the hope of developing a cure for the virus. The group is attacked by Cranks, humans infected with the Flare. However, they are saved by Jorge and Brenda, who join them.

The group makes it to the wall of the Last City, which protects the city from Cranks. Outside the wall, people are rallying in protest to be let into the city. When WCKD opens fire at the protesters, the group is captured and taken to a hideout by a crew wearing gas masks. One of the members is revealed to be Gally, who survived Minho's attack. Gally takes them to see Lawrence, a rebellion leader, who helps Thomas, Newt, and Gally enter the Last City. Gally leads Thomas and Newt through to the city and, after spotting Teresa, tells Thomas that he can get them into WCKD headquarters. Newt then confides to Thomas that he is infected. Promising to cure him, Thomas and Gally capture Teresa.

Disguised as WCKD soldiers, Thomas, Newt, and Gally escort Teresa inside WCKD headquarters and toward the location of the Immunes. Gally looks after the Immune children and stays to find a serum that slows the Flare. Thomas, Teresa and Newt go to find Minho, but are discovered and chased by Janson. Teresa lets them escape to find Minho before rushing to do a blood test on Thomas's blood, obtained when she was removing trackers from the Gladers. After delivering the Immune children and the serum to Brenda, Gally returns to WCKD headquarters to find Thomas. Brenda is forced to flee with the Immune children to avoid capture. Thomas and Newt reunite with Minho in the medical wing. Teresa discovers that Thomas's blood can cure the Flare. She shares her discovery with WCKD's leader, Ava Paige, both of whom agree that they must find Thomas. Brenda and the Immune children escape WCKD with Frypan's help.

Meanwhile, Lawrence rallies his rebels outside the city before he blows a hole in the city wall and sacrifices himself to allow his allies and the infected people to storm the city. Gally saves Thomas, Newt, and Minho from WCKD soldiers. While Minho and Gally go to get the serum from Brenda, Thomas gets a pendant from Newt before Newt passes out. Teresa transmits her voice throughout the city and tells Thomas that his blood can save Newt if only he will return to WCKD. Newt, nearly consumed by the Flare, regains consciousness, attacks Thomas, and begs Thomas to kill him. When Thomas refuses, Newt stabs himself with his own knife. Thomas returns to the WCKD facility and confronts Paige. While she talks with him, Janson, having caught the Flare, kills her and uses a sedative on Thomas. Thomas wakes up inside the facility. Teresa successfully removes some of his blood. She hears that Janson is interested only in curing himself and others whom he deems worthy. Teresa attacks Janson and frees Thomas, who fights with Janson. The fight ends when Thomas releases two Cranks, who kill Janson. With the building on fire, Thomas and Teresa escape to the roof. The rest of the team arrives on a berg. Teresa helps Thomas on board but dies when the building caves in.

The group escapes with the rest of the Immunes and the Right Arm to a safe haven, where the remaining population lives in safety. Thomas discovers that the pendant that Newt gave him had a note in it. He reads the note in which Newt tells him to look after everyone before he thanks Thomas for being his friend.

Cast 

 Dylan O'Brien as Thomas
 Kaya Scodelario as Teresa
 Thomas Brodie-Sangster as Newt
 Dexter Darden as Frypan
 Nathalie Emmanuel as Harriet
 Giancarlo Esposito as Jorge
 Aidan Gillen as Janson
 Walton Goggins as Lawrence
 Ki Hong Lee as Minho
 Jacob Lofland as Aris
 Katherine McNamara as Sonya
 Barry Pepper as Vince
 Will Poulter as Gally
 Rosa Salazar as Brenda
 Patricia Clarkson as Ava Paige

Production 
In March 2015, it was confirmed that T.S. Nowlin, who co-wrote the first and wrote the second film, would adapt Maze Runner: The Death Cure. On September 16, 2015, it was confirmed that Ball would return to direct the final film.

Filming 
Principal photography began on March 14, 2016, in Vancouver, British Columbia. Previously it was revealed at San Diego Comic-Con International that filming would begin in February 2016.

On March 18, 2016, it was reported that actor Dylan O'Brien had been hospitalized for injuries sustained on set during filming. James Dashner announced via Twitter that the production had been postponed after the accident. Producers were reported to be "looking to" resume filming around mid-May. According to the Directors Guild of Canada's production list, the film was scheduled to resume filming on May 9, and complete principal photography on July 26. However, on April 29, 2016, production was shut down indefinitely as O'Brien's injuries were revealed to be more serious than previously thought.

Filming resumed on March 6, 2017, in Cape Town, South Africa. In May 2017, it was announced that Walton Goggins would play the part of Lawrence, described as "an unusual and dangerous character who is part-revolutionary, part-anarchist, and a voice for the voiceless people." Principal photography wrapped on June 3, 2017.

Visual effects
The visual effects were provided by Weta Digital and supervised by Chris White.

Release 
The Death Cure was originally scheduled to be released in the United States on February 17, 2017. However, due to O'Brien's injuries, the studio said that it was unlikely that this date was going to be met. On May 27, 2016, 20th Century Fox rescheduled the film for January 12, 2018.

On April 22, 2017, the studio delayed the release date once again, to February 9, 2018, in order to allow more time for post-production; months later, on August 25, the studio moved the release forward two weeks. The film premiered on January 26, 2018.

Home media
Maze Runner: The Death Cure was released on Blu-Ray and DVD on April 24, 2018.

Reception

Box office
Maze Runner: The Death Cure grossed $58million in the United States and Canada, and $230.1million in other territories, for a worldwide total of $288.2million, against a production budget of $62million.

In the United States and Canada, The Death Cure was released alongside the wide expansion of Hostiles, and was expected to gross around $20 million from 3,786 theaters in its opening weekend. The film made $1.5 million from Thursday night previews, in between the $1.1 million made by the first film and $1.7 million by the second, and $8.4 million on its first day. It ended up opening to $24.2 million, down from the previous film but still finishing atop the box office. In its second weekend the film dropped 57% to $10.5 million, finishing second behind Jumanji: Welcome to the Jungle.

A week prior to its North American release, the film debuted in South Korea, Australia and Taiwan, grossing $15.1 million over its opening weekend. During the first two weeks of international release, the film dominated the international box office taking $62.6 and $35.2 million respectively, and outpacing the two previous films.

Critical response
The website's critical consensus reads, "Maze Runner: The Death Cure may offer closure to fans of the franchise, but for anyone who hasn't already been hooked, this bloated final installment is best left unseen." On Metacritic, the film has a weighted average score of 51 out of 100, based on 37 critics, indicating "mixed or average reviews". Audiences polled by CinemaScore gave the film an average grade of "B+" on an A+ to F scale.

Accolades

Future
Following the acquisition of 21st Century Fox by Disney in March 2019, Disney confirmed in April 2019 at their CinemaCon presentation that new Maze Runner films were in development.

References

External links 

 
 

2018 science fiction films
2010s teen films
20th Century Fox films
American science fiction action films
American sequel films
American survival films
American dystopian films
American films about revenge
Films about viral outbreaks
Films based on American novels
Films based on science fiction novels
Films directed by Wes Ball
Films set in North America
Films shot in South Africa
IMAX films
The Maze Runner
American post-apocalyptic films
American science fiction adventure films
Teen mystery films
Films produced by Wyck Godfrey
Films scored by John Paesano
Teen science fiction films
2010s American films